Aphonopelma armada is a species of spider in the family Theraphosidae, found in Texas in the United States.

References

armada
Spiders of the United States
Spiders described in 1940